Shokat Ali (born 4 March 1970) is an English snooker player of Pakistani descent, who represents Pakistan in international tournaments.

Career
Ali turned professional in 1991, but his best performance in professional competition came ten years later in the 2001 Thailand Masters where he reached the quarter-finals, beating Ronnie O'Sullivan en route. He first gained notice when he defeated Jimmy White to reach the last 16 of the 1998 Grand Prix, and also enjoyed a run of form in 1999.

He has career earnings of over £240,000 and has a high  of 139. In 1998 Ali became the first man to win a gold medal for cue sports in world competition which he achieved at the Asian Games.

Ali also won an episode on the game show "The Big Break" in 1996. In doing so, he became the first Pakistani snooker player to win the show.

In 2005, his cue was stolen from his car, and he suffered a deterioration of results as he struggled to find another cue he could show his best form using. He dropped off the game's Main professional tour in 2007, but showed signs of a return to form in 2008, winning an event on the secondary PIOS Tour.

Together with fellow player and horse enthusiast Chris Norbury, Ali is co-owner of Elite Snooker Club in Preston.

Ali was awarded the Tamgha-e-Imtiaz by the Pakistani government for his gold medal achievement.

Performance and rankings timeline

Career finals

Non-ranking finals: 2 (1 title)

Amateur finals: 1 (1 title)

References

Pakistani snooker players
1970 births
Living people
English people of Pakistani descent
People from Accrington
British sportspeople of Pakistani descent
Asian Games medalists in cue sports
Asian Games gold medalists for Pakistan
Asian Games bronze medalists for Pakistan
Medalists at the 1998 Asian Games
Cue sports players at the 1998 Asian Games
Cue sports players at the 2006 Asian Games
World Games bronze medalists
Competitors at the 2001 World Games